Inner North is the second album by The Guild League released in 2004 on Candle Records (catalogue number TGL03), described by the band as "twelve songs about turning points, trust and the sky" .

Track listing
 "Animals"  
 "The Storm"
 "Trust"  
 "Citronella"
 "Shot In The Arm" 
 "Why Wait?" 
 "Time Please Gents"
 "Scientists"  
 "Fingers Of Sun"  
 "Falling Ovation"  
 "Where Are You Now?"  
 "Shirtless Sky"

2004 albums